Dr. M. G. R. Home and Higher Secondary School for the Speech and Hearing Impaired is a school established on 17 January 1990 in Kanchipuram, Tamil Nadu, India.

About
The home is recognised by the Commissioner of Rehabilitation of the Differently abled  of the Government of Tamil Nadu and is listed by the Ali Yavar Jung National Institute For The Hearing Handicapped as a vocational training centre for the hearing impaired.

The school has trained staff to handle classes up to the higher secondary level. Students take examinations to distance education programmes of universities. Students are encouraged to integrate into mainstream schools.

The school and home was established and is maintained by the MGR Memorial Charitable Trust.

External links

  official website of the institution

References

Schools for the deaf in India
Charities based in India
Primary schools in Tamil Nadu
High schools and secondary schools in Chennai
Memorials to M G Ramachandran
Educational institutions established in 1990
1990 establishments in Tamil Nadu